David Marston Clough (December 27, 1846 – August 28, 1924) was an American lumberman and politician. He served in the Minnesota State Senate from January 1887 to January 1893. He served as the state's Lieutenant Governor, January 9, 1893 to January 31, 1895. He was the 13th Governor of Minnesota from January 31, 1895 to January 2, 1899. He was a Republican.

Life and career
Clough was born in 1846 in Lyme, New Hampshire, the fourth of fourteen children of Sarah C. (Brown) and Elbridge G. Clough, New England farmers who resettled near the Rum River. Clough helped his family eke out a scanty living from the land by raising crops and cutting timber. His boyhood experiences would serve him well as both an entrepreneur and public servant in a state where agriculture and lumber dominated the economy.

Clough's first business venture, a logging operation he founded at 20, lifted him from poverty and launched him on a path toward wealth and political prominence. He moved to Minneapolis in 1872 and was elected to the city council eleven years later and then to the Minnesota Senate. From the Senate, he advanced to the office of lieutenant governor under Republican Knute Nelson, whose election to the U.S. Senate moved Clough into the governor's office.

Clough's first administration was notable for the ratification of significant amendments to the state constitution, including those establishing the Minnesota Board of Pardons, withdrawing the right of aliens to vote, and authorizing municipalities to frame "home rule" charters. During his second term, narrowly won in 1896, the legislature raised taxes on several private industries and enacted child-labor laws.

In 1900 the redoubtable railroad magnate James J. Hill urged Clough to establish a lumber operation near Puget Sound. Until his death on August 28, 1924, at age 77, the logger-turned-lumber baron lived in Everett, Washington, where he championed the interests of the mill owners against their employees' unionization efforts. He was buried at Evergreen Cemetery in Everett.

Clough is the namesake of Culdrum Township, Morrison County, Minnesota.

References

Biographical information and his  gubernatorial records are available for research use at the Minnesota Historical Society.
Minnesota Legislators Past and Present

  	

1846 births
1924 deaths
People from Lyme, New Hampshire
American manufacturing businesspeople
Republican Party governors of Minnesota
Lieutenant Governors of Minnesota
Republican Party Minnesota state senators
Businesspeople in timber